Oyotunji African Village is a village located near Sheldon, Beaufort County, South Carolina that was founded by Oba Efuntola Oseijeman Adelabu Adefunmi I in 1970.

Oyotunji village is named after the Oyo empire, and the name literally means Oyo returns or Oyo rises again. During the 1970s, the era of greatest population growth at the village, the number of inhabitants grew from 5 to between 200 and 250. The population is rumored to fluctuate between 5 and 9 families as of the last 10 years. It was originally intended to be located in Savannah, Georgia, but was eventually settled into its current position after disputes with neighbors in Sheldon proper, over drumming and tourists.

Since Adefunmi's death in 2005, the village has been led by his son, Oba Adejuyigbe Adefunmi II. The village is constructed to be analogous to the villages of the traditional Yoruba city-states in modern-day Nigeria, although modernization of the village's public works have been carried out under Adefunmi II.

References

Sources

Further reading

An Oral History of the West African Village That Has Been in South Carolina for Four Decades
 Ile Ifa Jalumi - Oyotunji Outpost
 RoadsideAmerica.com article
 Òyötùnjí Village: Making Africans in America - Anthropology Master's Thesis by Antionette B. Brown-Waithe
 Welcome to the Kingdom Oyotunji African Village via Internet Archive
 About Oyotunji African Village
"Against the Odds, A 40-Year Old West African Village in South Carolina Has Thrived"

External links

African-American history of South Carolina
Intentional communities in the United States
Populated places in Beaufort County, South Carolina
Religious organizations established in 1970
Yoruba-American history
Yoruba culture
Yoruba religion
Populated places established in 1970
1970 establishments in South Carolina
Populated places in South Carolina established by African Americans